Avital Carroll (née Shimko, born 24 April 1996) is an Austrian and former American mogul skier.

Biography 
Carroll had her first international success at the 2015 Junior World Championships, where she won the silver medal behind French racer Perrine Laffont and ahead of then teammate Jaelin Kauf.

On 7 June 2022, Carroll announced that she choose to competed under the Austrian flag. This was possible due to a new Austrian law, granting citizenship to descendants of displaced persons.

At the 2023 Snowboard World Championships, Carroll became the first Austrian since Margarita Marbler to win a medal in the moguls event.

Personal life 
Her grandmother Elfi Hendell was born in Vienna, her grandfather David Hendell in modern-day Croatia. They both flew to the United States in 1944. On 7 September 2020, she married her coach Bobby Carroll and has competed under her husband's name.

World Championships results 

 2 medals – (2 bronze)

Junior World Championships results 

 1 medals – (1 silver)

References

External links 

 

Austrian female freestyle skiers
American female freestyle skiers
1996 births
Living people
21st-century Austrian women
21st-century American women